Edgcote is a village and former civil parish, now in the parish of Chipping Warden and Edgcote, on the River Cherwell in south-west Northamptonshire, England. The parish was bounded by the river to the north and by one of its tributaries to the east.

The villages name possibly means, 'cottage(s) of the Hwicce', a tribal name.

Edgcote House

Edgcote House is an 18th-century country house of two storeys plus a basement and a nine bay frontage. It is built of local ironstone with dressings of fine grey stone. Features include a carved mahogany staircase, and a drawing room decorated in a Chinese style. It is a Grade I listed building.

In 1543 the Edgcote estate, which had previously belonged to Anne of Cleves, was bought from the Crown by William Chauncy, MP for Northamptonshire and High Sheriff of Northamptonshire for 1579.

In 1642 Edgcote House was used as headquarters by the army of Charles I before the Battle of Edgehill on 23 October, the first major battle of the English Civil War.

The poet Mary Leapor worked at Edgcote House at a point in her life, and the poem "Crumble-Hall" was inspired by her time working there.

By 1742 the house had descended to Richard Chauncy, a London merchant, who commissioned the architect William Jones to build the present house in 1747–52 to replace a previous building. He employed the carpenter Abraham Swan, and the plasterer John Whitehead. Initially the stables were surveyed by William Smith of Warwick (1705–1747), and rebuilt 1745–7. The London blacksmith Thomas Stephens (d. 1771) made a cast-iron balustrade, and the house was furnished in the later 1750s by Vile & Cobb (William Vile and John Cobb).

His son William Henry Chauncy caused the village of Edgcote to be resited to improve his view sometime before 1788. The estate then passed to his unmarried sister Anna Maria Chauncy and from her to Thomas Carter, Richard Chauncy’s great-nephew, and from him to a distant cousin, Julia Frances Aubrey, who was married to William Cartwright. They moved in during 1847 and the Cartwrights remained in possession until 1926, when they were obliged to sell it to the Courage family. It has since been bought by businessman David Allen.

The  park was laid out in the 18th century and features a lake fed by the River Cherwell and the remains of a Roman villa. The house is heated by heat energy extracted from the lake.

BBC Television used the house in its 1995 television adaptation of Jane Austen's Pride and Prejudice. The estate may be adversely affected by the proposed HS2 high speed railway line.

Parish church
The oldest parts of the Church of England parish church of St. James are the 13th century south doorway and three-bay south arcade. Inside the church is a series of monuments to the Chauncey family. The oldest are to Toby Chauncey (died 1579) and William Chauncey (died 1585). They are followed by four monuments to 17th and 18th century members of the family carved by the Flemish sculptor John Michael Rysbrack.

St. James' has a ring of four bells plus a sanctus bell. The sanctus bell was cast in about 1500 by an unidentified bell-founder. Bartholomew Atton of Buckingham cast the oldest bell in the ring in 1592. His successor Robert Atton cast the tenor bell in 1623. Henry I Bagley of Chacombe cast the third bell in 1660 and the treble bell in 1668. The ring is currently unringable.

St. James' parish is a member of the Benefice of Culworth with Sulgrave and Thorpe Mandeville and Chipping Warden with Edgcote and Moreton Pinkney.

The Vicarage south of the church is a Georgian house of five bays.

References

Sources

Villages in Northamptonshire
Former civil parishes in Northamptonshire
Country houses in Northamptonshire
West Northamptonshire District